The Fortress of Muxima, built of stone and mortar in 1599, is situated in the Bengo Province of Angola next to the Cuanza River.

History 

Founded in 1599, the Fortress of "Muxima" is placed in the district of Muxima on the left bank of the Kwanza River, Province of Bengo. It deals with the first prison of the Angolan occupation period. It helped the advance of penetration to the interior of the Angolan territory and assured the defense against the Angolan people who offered resistance to the Portuguese occupation and the other colonial potencies, of which the ships going up the Kwanza River went looking for the slaves in the interior of the country. Its building would come to support the trading relationships, the markets, the inlander ones, the ivory and slave trafficking. The Fortress of "Muxina" was used as the basis of Portuguese forces and its support when they went to the interior making raids and wars of "kwata-kwata" (wars among the Africans linked to the Europeans who working to them, caught the other Africans for the slavery). The slaves went by land in long raws to the vila of Calumbo, or were sent by sea in the Muxirna harbour and going down by ship the Kwanza River were sent to America. It was classified as National Monument by Provincial Decret n. 2, 12 of January 1924. This Fortress is badly preserved and constitute a state property. The responsibility for its maintenance and preservation concerns the Ministry of Culture.

World Heritage status 

This site was added to the UNESCO World Heritage Tentative List on 22 November 1996 in the Cultural category.

See also 

 World Heritage sites in Africa

References 

Infrastructure completed in 1599
Muxima
Bengo Province